Tullio Pizzorno (born 10 February 1921, date of death unknown) was an Italian sailor who competed in the 1960 Summer Olympics.

References

1921 births
Year of death missing
Italian male sailors (sport)
Olympic sailors of Italy
Sailors at the 1960 Summer Olympics – Flying Dutchman
Flying Dutchman class world champions
World champions in sailing for Italy